Hans Wolfgang von Gronau (25 February 1893 - 17 March 1977) was a German aviation pioneer.

Biography
Wolfgang von Gronau was born in Berlin in a family hailing from the ancient dynasty of the House of Berg. He was the son of artillery General Hans von Gronau (1850–1940) and Luise Gerischer (1867–1926).

Right before World War I he joined the Imperial German Navy where he was put in charge of a flying boat squadron. After the disbandment of the imperial military in 1919 von Gronau had reached the rank of Oberleutnant zur See, highest lieutenant grade in the German Navy.

On 18 August 1930 von Gronau flew on a transatlantic flight on a Dornier Wal —the old D-1422 flying boat that Amundsen had flown earlier. He took off from Sylt (Germany) through Faroe Islands, Iceland, Greenland and Labrador, reaching New York City after covering  in 47 flight hours.

On 21 July 1932 von Gronau flew from Germany around the world on another Dornier Wal flying boat —named "Grönland Wal" (Greenland Whale)— with a crew of three people.

In 1934 he became the president of the Aeroclub von Deutschland and in 1935 vice president of the Fédération Aéronautique Internationale. Von Gronau was posted to the German Embassy in Tokyo as air attaché shortly before the outbreak of World War II. He lived as a diplomat in Japan until the end of the war, having reached the rank of Major general when the Third Reich was disbanded.

In 1947 von Gronau moved to Upper Bavaria. He died in Frasdorf in 1977 while he was living in retirement. His remains were buried in List auf Sylt, close to the tomb of his wife.

Honours
Wolfgang von Gronau won the Harmon Trophy in 1932. In List auf Sylt stands a stone memorial to his flying boat exploits.

The Gronau Nunataks and the Gronau Glacier in northern King Christian IX Land, Greenland, were named after him.

A street in the capital city of the Philippines, Manila was named after him, although misspelled as Von Granao.

Bibliography
 M. Michiel van der Mey: Dornier Wal – „A Light coming over the Sea“.
 Wolfgang von Gronau. Pionierflüge mit dem Dornier-Wal. Luftfahrt-Verlag Walter Zuerl, Steinebach-Wörthsee

References

External links 
 
 
 

1893 births
1977 deaths
Aviation pioneers
German World War I pilots
Imperial German Navy personnel of World War I
Military personnel from Berlin
House of Berg
Major generals of the Luftwaffe